The 2009–10 UEFA Futsal Cup was the 24th edition of Europe's premier club futsal tournament and the 9th edition under the current UEFA Futsal Cup format.

Teams

th Title Holder

Preliminary round

Group A

Group B

Tassos Papadoulos, Nicosia

Group C

Bregovi, Trebinje

Group D

Tapiola Urheiluhalli, Espoo

Group E

S.Darius & S.Girenas Sport Center, Kaunas

Group F

SHS Wr. Neustadt Dr. Fred Sinowatz Schule, Wiener Neustadt

Group G

Sport Halle Kale, Skopje

Main Round

Group 1

Fönix Arena, Debrecen

Group 2

Zimní Stadión, Chrudim

Group 3

La Garenne, Charleroi

Group 4

Solski Center, Tolmin

Group 5

Dom Sportova "Mate Parlov", Pula

Group 6

Sports Hall, Deva

Elite Round

Group 1

Group 2

Group 3

Group 4

Final four

Semifinals

Third place play-off

Final

Top goalscorers

References

External links
 Official UEFA Futsal Cup website
 "Benfica delight Lisbon masses"

UEFA Futsal Champions League
Cup